Slow Dark Train  is an album by the American band Vigilantes of Love, released in 1997. Some Christian stores refused to carry the album due to the inclusion of "Love Cocoon", a song about marital sex. The band supported the album with a North American tour.

Production
The album was produced by Bill Mallonee, Danny Horrid, and Dan Russell. "Love Cocoon" first appeared on the band's debut album, Jugular.

Critical reception

The Dallas Observer wrote that "Vigilantes of Love is a unique blend of (American) rock 'n' roll and thoughtful spirituality that doesn't let its higher ambition get in the way of rocking the house." The Atlanta Journal-Constitution thought that the band's "ongoing romance with roots-rock turns into blind adoration here, as head Vigilante Bill Mallonee checks his usually intricate lyrics and pop sensibilities for the offhand, roadhouse vibe of Son Volt or Wilco."

The Windsor Star stated that the album "delivers messages of hope, commitment, and inner strength through Mallonee's subtle Christian beliefs." The Dayton Daily News called it a "wrenching, poignant, anguished and a terrific piece of work."

AllMusic deemed the album "all highlights."

Track listing

References

1997 albums
Capricorn Records albums